Lisa Cheng may refer to:
 Lisa Cheng (bodybuilder)
 Lisa Cheng (linguist)